Hu Yaoyu (Chinese: 胡耀宇; Pinyin: Hú Yàoyǔ; born January 18, 1982) is a Chinese professional Go player.

Biography 
Hu became a pro at the age most Chinese players do which is 11. He quickly achieved 5 dan in 5 years, and became 8 dan in 2005. He has beaten some of the best players in the world, and he did it in order. From 2002 to 2003, he beat Kobayashi Koichi, Kim Seung-Jun, Kato Masao, Cho Hun-hyeon, and Yoda Norimoto in the 4th Nong Shim Cup.

Titles & runners-up

References 

1982 births
Living people
Go players from Shanghai